This page details Dundee United records.

Player records

Appearances
Most international appearances: Maurice Malpas (55 for Scotland)
Most League appearances: Maurice Malpas (617, 1981–2000)
 Youngest player: Chris Mochrie, aged 16 years and 27 days (against Greenock Morton in the Scottish Championship on 4 May 2019) 
 Oldest player: Jimmy Brownlie, aged 40 years and eight months (against Hearts at Tynecastle in February 1926, as an emergency goalkeeper)

All-time appearances
As of 1 January 2007 (Competitive matches only, includes appearances as substitute):

Goalscorers
Most League goals: Peter McKay (158 during 1947–1954)
Most League goals in one season: Johnny Coyle (43 in 1955–56)
Youngest scorer: David Goodwillie, aged 16 years and 11 months (against Hibernian)

All-time goalscorers
As of 1 January 2007 (Competitive matches only, includes appearances as substitute):

Club records

Scores
Biggest win: 14–0 v Nithsdale Wanderers, Scottish Cup 1st Round, 17 January 1931
Biggest league win: 12–1 v East Stirlingshire, Scottish Football League Division Two, 13 April 1936
Worst defeat: 1–12 v Motherwell, Scottish Football League Division Two, 23 January 1954

Goals
Most league goals: 108 during 1935–36 in Division Two (3.2 per match)
Fewest league goals: 21 during 1911–12 in Division Two (0.95 per match)
Fastest goals: Finn Dossing, after 14 seconds into the Division One match against Hamilton Academical at Tannadice on 16 October 1965 and Johnny Russell, also after 14 seconds in a Scottish Cup tie against Rangers at Tannadice on 2 February 2013.
Most goals in one match: Albert Juliussen, with six of United's seven in a North Eastern League Cup match against St Bernard's on 15 November 1941
Several players have scored five:
Collie Martin in a Scottish Football League Division Two match in December 1914
Tim Williamson in a Scottish Cup match in January 1931
Willie Ouchterlonie in Division Two matches in November and December 1933
Willie Black in the same competition in March 1939
Paul Sturrock scored all five in a 5–0 Premier Division win against Morton in November 1984.

Wins
Most consecutive wins: 11 during the last 6 matches of 1982–83 and the first five of the 1983–84
Most league wins in a season: 24 from 36 games (1928–29 and 1982–83)

Attendances
Highest home attendance: 28,000 v CF Barcelona, European Fairs Cup 2nd Round 2nd Leg, 16 November 1966
Largest crowd involving Dundee United: 100,000+ against Selangor for the formal opening of the Shah Alam Stadium, Selangor, Malaysia, in July 1994

Transfers
Record transfers as of 1 August 2008 (figures based on press reports). Where some records have been equalled, only the first instance is shown.

Bought
The current record signing is former Scotland international Steven Pressley, who was signed from Coventry City in July 1995 for £750,000.

Source: https://web.archive.org/web/20081208045249/http://www.dundeeunitedfc.co.uk/index.asp?pg=302

Sold
The current record sale is former Scotland international Duncan Ferguson, who was sold to Rangers in July 1993 for £4,000,000.

Source: https://web.archive.org/web/20081208045249/http://www.dundeeunitedfc.co.uk/index.asp?pg=302

References

Records
Dundee United
Records